Arthur Charles Gill was Archdeacon of Cloyne from 1968 until 1986.

He was educated at Trinity College, Dublin. After curacies in Maryborough and Preban he held incumbencies at Schull, Ballydehob and Templebreedy. He was treasurer of Cloyne Cathedral from 1959 until 1968.

References

Alumni of Trinity College Dublin
Archdeacons of Cloyne
1898 births
Year of death unknown